Wilbur Floyd "Wib" Smith (August 30, 1886 – November 18, 1959) was a Major League Baseball catcher who played in  with the St. Louis Browns.

External links

1886 births
1959 deaths
Major League Baseball catchers
Baseball players from Michigan
St. Louis Browns players
Minor league baseball managers
Tecumseh (minor league baseball) players
Pueblo Indians players
Minneapolis Millers (baseball) players
People from Evart, Michigan
Watertown Cubs players